The Assineau River is a short river forming in central Alberta. The Assineau flows into Lesser Slave Lake, which flows out through the Lesser Slave River, a major tributary of the Athabasca River. The name for the river was in use by 1904. It is suggested that Assineau is a version of the Cree word for nobody.

The river forms in Grizzly Ridge Wildland Provincial Park and heads north towards Lesser Slave Lake. The river is bridged by Alberta Highway 2 and flows past the hamlet of Assineau, Alberta.

See also
List of Alberta rivers

References

Rivers of Alberta